Shah Valad may refer to:
 Shah Valad, Isfahan
 Shah Valad, Lorestan